The Louisiana Music Hall of Fame (LMHOF) is a non-profit hall of fame based in Baton Rouge, the capital of the U.S. state of Louisiana, that seeks to honor and preserve the state's music culture and heritage and to promote education about the state's unique role in contributing to American indigenous and popular music in the 20th century. The motto of the LMHOF is "honoring and preserving Louisiana's greatest renewable natural resource". Its primary outreach currently consists of a growing online "multimedia virtual museum". The organization actively develops partnerships and programs for collections, exhibitions, education aids and programs and performances. The LMHOF also seeks to stimulate economic growth by promoting the rejuvenation of the state's music industry.

Overview of Louisiana's Music
Among the over 250 artists who have been inducted into the Louisiana Music Hall of Fame to date are Fats Domino, Jerry Lee Lewis, Little Richard, Dave Bartholomew, Elvis Presley, Johnny Rivers, Lloyd Price, Lead Belly, Cosimo Matassa, Louis Armstrong, Mahalia Jackson, Pete Fountain, Buddy Guy, Gov. Jimmie Davis, Ellis Marsalis, Webb Pierce, Dale Hawkins, Louis Prima, Percy Sledge, Irma Thomas, Roy Brown, "Dr. John" Mac Rebennack, Jelly Roll Morton, Allen Toussaint, Al "Carnival Time" Johnson, Bill Conti, Tim McGraw, Trace Adkins, Hunter Hayes, Hank Williams Sr. & Jr., and Clarence "Frogman" Henry. The list of inductees is expected to eventually top 1,000 international luminaries, and the program will expand to include recognition of significant songwriters, support musicians, business icons and regionally famous artists in niche recognition categories. The range of inductees reflects the true diversity of Louisiana's music and its impact on 20th-century music around the world. In the 1920s, Lead Belly and Jelly Roll Morton covered the spectrum arching over blues forms from Shreveport to New Orleans. As eras passed, Louis Armstrong and Louis Prima dominated, Webb Pierce and Gov. Jimmie Davis and country music rolled as Cosimo Matassa recorded "Good Rockin' Tonight" which spread immediately from New Orleans to Shreveport through The Louisiana Hayride, effectively merging the "Hayride" and New Orleans genres into a whole new genre. Mahalia Jackson became the dominant gospel artist and Pete Fountain and Al Hirt jazzed the world. In the 1950s and 1960s, the likes of Fats Domino, Jerry Lee Lewis, Dale Hawkins, Johnny Rivers, Frogman Henry, Robert Parker, Phil Phillips, John Fred & His Playboys, Jimmy Clanton, The Meters, The Dixie Cups, and Jean Knight dominated the charts and record sales. Even Louisiana's writers like Bobby Charles, Allen Toussaint, Dave Bartholomew and Dick Holler drove the industry with their songs. Throughout this global process, Louisiana continued to grow its own unique and original Cajun, Zydeco and "Swamp Pop" musical genres. Few people appreciate that in the early 19th century New Orleans was the site of the first opera house in America and produced one of the country's first major composers, Louis Moreau Gottschalk. From Classical to Rock & Roll, Jazz to Rhythm & Blues, Gospel to Country & Western, Louisiana has been integral to American music history and was at the forefront of the music revolutions of the 20th century.

Exhibits
The Louisiana Music Hall of Fame has launched an innovative LMHOF "Multimedia Virtual Museum" online concept. While physical exhibits are in the development plans, the Internet now provides people anywhere in the world to visit and immerse themselves in the rich culture of Louisiana music. The LMHOF</ref> allow visitors to spend as much or as little time as they choose, and visit at any time that they choose. Extensive static images, music files and video albums are provided on each inductee. 
The ongoing one-on-one interaction with inductees and future inductees gleans the history and details of the music and artists directly from the artists. Combining and correlating this information with the constant research and discovery of facts and artifacts, and adding the immediate publishing time of the virtual museum, the LMHOF is able to provide the most accurate and current information available anywhere.

In July 2015 the LMHOF launched the "LMHOF Wall Of Fame at BTR," a truly unique double-sided display consisting of 43 Gold records accompanied by unique artwork honoring 43 LMHOF Inductee members and accompanying dual 50" ultra-flat LED screens giving points of the history of the 43 artists in the Baton Rouge Metro Airport public area.

In the future, the Louisiana Music Hall of Fame has plans to open larger displays featuring more complex Gold record presentations as well as displays featuring artifacts in display of Inductee members in as many as three more locations across the state and a full blown museum display in Baton Rouge or New Orleans, the home of America's music.

Education and preservation
Education is the heart of The Louisiana Music Hall of Fame's mission. The organization has plans to create "The History of Louisiana Music" popular/text book as the forerunner for inclusion of Louisiana music history in curricula in the state's Universities and Junior Colleges. These programs include oral histories, narrated biographies, music and recorded live performances. Louisiana Ticket programming will also be available to the world via the LMHOF web site and, beginning in 2016, through HD air and cable channel television broadcasts throughout most of Louisiana.

LMHOF's multimedia virtual museum is rapidly becoming a valuable resource for research on and about Louisiana artists and music. The LMHOF also stores redundant digital files of its entire archives assuring survival of the content. The LMHOF records oral history interviews with inductees and other valued assets wherever possible and records all performances in HD and multi-track digital audio as they archive exclusive and unique performances for historical reference. Many of these oral history pieces can now be found in the virtual museum under the appropriate inductee, as can numerous live performance recordings ever known to exist by many of the inductees.

Louisiana Ticket and Good Rockin' Tonight
The Louisiana Music Hall of Fame produces a '"Louisiana Ticket'" video series, first begun in 1999, as both the official museum broadcast series with in-depth looks at Louisiana's artists and music. The state's legends, landmarks and unsung heroes are explored through insightful features, historical articles, news and reviews. Louisiana Ticket will also soon distribute this programming across the world through the LMHOF Web site and through HD broadcasts throughout Louisiana via cable television networks.
Currently, The Louisiana Music Hall Of Fame is producing "Good Rockin' Tonight," a series of One-hour talk and Live music shows that now number 14 completed shows! And, more to come...

History
The Louisiana Music Hall of Fame's institutional history began in 1979 when, with help from current driving force Mike Shepherd, Del Moon, a Baton Rouge print and television entertainment journalist first put forward his intent to create the LMHOF. In 1980, a corporation was formed, nonprofit status obtained and the initial project drive began. After several years, Moon back shelved the full-time pursuit of the project, having fought a severe economic recession and having received only cursory cooperation from State and local government and funding entities. Moon allowed the corporation to be dissolved and public work diminished around 1997.

Over the years, Moon and Shepherd continued to conceive a better approach from another State while an early adviser in Louisiana continued on with the project's development and archival activities.

For a time in the nineties and early 2000s, a non-certified, non-recognized group out of Lafayette, conducted business using variations of the name, and "inducted" well over a thousand individuals without even keeping a list of those "inductees." That issue is discussed on the LMHOF Official web site in the "HISTORY" section. All inductees of The Louisiana Music Hall of Fame are included in the list below.  The "non-certified" inductees from that time and dubious effort, are considered to have never been inducted and do not appear on the web site. Even though The Louisiana Music Hall of Fame knows there are well over a thousand individuals who they refer to as "non-certified" and knows who many of them are, the LMHOF has chosen not to induct these artists in any "wholesale" manner. The people who made these changes showed sophomoric arrogance and were very insensitive to past/existing members. This can only be described as a Power Grab, so typical of Louisana entities. 

In 2005, after several years of pre-development and archival effort, that early adviser, a music industry veteran, Mike Shepherd of Baton Rouge La.,  took up the gauntlet, establishing a new corporation with IRS 501c3 certification, re-acquired use of The Louisiana Music Hall Of Fame name from Louisiana's Secretary Of State (whose predecessor had arguably registered the name to himself in 2004 despite over 20 years of usage at that time) and immediately contacted Moon for continued support and active participation. He got it. Shepherd subsequently reacquired clear registration of the trade name "The Louisiana Music Hall Of Fame" from the newly elected and sitting Louisiana Secretary of State Tom Schedler in early 2011.

In 2009 LMHOF facilitated pro bono an advertising endorsement agreement between Al "Carnival Time" Johnson and the Louisiana Lottery Corporation which resulted in unprecedented media exposure and royalties to Johnson for use of his image, voice and signature song in a scratch ticket promotion during Mardi Gras season.

The new Louisiana Music Hall Of Fame blueprint envisions future public exhibits but immediately took advantage of the Internet by launching a unique multimedia "virtual museum"  from a Web site and began honoring Louisiana musicians who have made significant contributions to the music industry. With so much to work on, the decision was made to reach out to the "living legends" and surviving family first in an induction plan rather than engage in a time-consuming thematic/historical approach. As Hurricane Katrina ripped New Orleans, it quickly became apparent that digital was the only way to go. An incredible amount of Louisiana's music history washed away overnight. With the cooperation of Governors Kathleen Blanco and Bobby Jindal, the project has quickly become a prototype for the digital age of museums. That web site has now been visited by over 2.75 Million music fans across the world!

Plans continue for brick and mortar facilities throughout the State, along with numerous projects designed to aid in heightened global awareness of Louisiana's artists and music, as well as developmental tools and facilities to assist in the resurgence in Louisiana's classic music genres.

Over 100 fundraising induction concerts have been staged to date, including "Louisiana's Greatest Hits-Live" held in Baton Rouge on October 27, 2007 and the Louisiana Music Homecoming on May 16, 2010.

In the 2010 Session of the Louisiana Legislature, by unanimous vote of both the State Senate and State House of Representatives on SCR 112, The Louisiana Music Hall Of Fame, was commended for its work and further declared as "the official honors and recognition organization and information resource for and about Louisiana's music, musicians and musical heritage," thus becoming the first ever Official Louisiana Music Hall Of Fame after thirty years.

On January 27, 2014, The Louisiana Music Hall Of Fame web site reached the 1,000,000 visit plateau and in October 2015 reached 2.35 Million visits, and it currently stands at over 2.75 Million visits, to date.

Inductees
Name and Date Inducted

Louis Armstrong -                  December 7, 2008
Bag Of Donuts -                    March 13, 2019
Marcia Ball -                      2012
Dave Bartholomew -                 November 8, 2009
Harold Battiste -                  November 7, 2010
BeauSoleil -                       October 16, 2011
Tab Benoit -                       May 16, 2010
Rod Bernard -                      January 29, 2012
Kix Brooks -                       July 13, 2013
The Boswell Sisters -              April 13, 2008
James Burton -                     August 22, 2009
Bobby Charles -                    October, 2007
Chubby Carrier -                   October 16, 2011
Clifton Chenier -                  June 25, 2011
Jay Chevalier -                    December 7, 2008
Jimmy Clanton -                    April 14, 2007
Bill Conti -                       April 22, 2008
Lee Cole -                       March 13, 2019
Cowboy Mouth -                     May 14, 2011
Floyd Cramer -                     December 7, 2008
James "Sugarboy" Crawford -        November 7, 2010
Dale & Grace -                     October 27, 2007
Dash Rip Rock -                    January 7, 2012
Jimmie Davis -                     October 27, 2007
The Dixie Cups -                   April 14, 2007
Fats Domino -                      October 2007
Elvis Presley                      2013
D J Fontana                        2013
Frankie Ford -                     May 16, 2010
Pete Fountain -                    March 18, 2007
John Fred -                        April 14, 2007
Playboy Band -                     May 16, 2010
Mickey Gilley -                    August 28, 2011
Henry Gray                         2013
Buddy Guy -                        April 16, 2008
Dale Hawkins -                     October 27, 2007
Clarence "Frogman" Henry -         April 14, 2007
Al Hirt -                          November 7, 2009
Leigh "Lil Queenie" Harris - February 23, 2019
Slim Harpo -                       September 25, 2011
Hunter Hayes -                     September 7, 2012
Dick Holler -                      October 27, 2007
Johnny Horton -                    August 22, 2009
Mahalia Jackson -                  December 7, 2008
Al "Carnival Time" Johnson -       April 14, 2007
George Jones -                     October 3, 2011
Kidd Jordan -                      November 7, 2010
Ernie K-Doe -                      August 2, 2009
Luther Kent -                      November 18, 2011
Doug Kershaw -                     October 9, 2009
Sammy Kershaw -                    December 7, 2008
Bobby Kimball -                    May 16, 2010
Jean Knight -                      October 27, 2007
Ronnie Kole -                      November 4, 2012
Sonny Landreth -                   October 25, 2012
Lead Belly -                       December 7, 2008
LeRoux -            October 10, 2009
Jerry LaCroix -                    January 29, 2012
Jerry Lee Lewis -                  June 4, 2008
Stan Lewis - August 22, 2009
Chris LeBlanc -                    April 22, 2019
Lillian Axe -                      May 16, 2010
Little Richard -                   May 30, 2009
Little Walter Jacobs               2013
Louisiana Hayride -                August 22, 2009
LSU Tiger Band -                   September 11, 2009
Master P -                         July 4, 2013
Cosimo Matassa -                   October 27, 2007
Dennis McGee -                     December 11, 2011
Gerry McGee -                      December 11, 2011
Tim McGraw -                       August 3, 2012
Tommy McLain -                     October 27, 2007
Ellis Marsalis - December 7, 2008
Jelly Roll Morton -                December 7, 2008
Gregg Martinez -                   April 22, 2019
D. L. Menard -                     October 9, 2009
S J Montalbano -                   February 7, 2012
John Moore -     April 24, 2008
Kenny Neal -                       September 25, 2011
Jimmy C Newman -                   October 9, 2009
Randy Newman -                     February 11, 2011
Aaron Neville -                    December 12, 2010
Neville Brothers -                 January 7, 2012
Joe Osborn -                       June 12, 2010
Robert Parker - April 14, 2007
Phil Phillips -                    October 27, 2007
Potliquor -                        October 20, 2012
Queen Ida Guillory -     April 26, 2013
Webb Pierce -                      October 27, 2007
Lloyd Price -                      March 9, 2010
Louis Prima -                      December 7, 2008
Wardell Quezergue -                November 7, 2010
The Radiators -    June 10, 2011
Eddy Raven -                       September 14, 2012
Mac Rebennack -                    December 28, 2007
River Road -     May 14, 2011
Johnny Rivers -                    June 12, 2009
John Schneider - January 29, 2019
Mike Shepherd -                        December 1, 2013
Eddie Shuler -                     May 11, 2013
Benny Spellman -                   August 2, 2009
Lucas Spinosa -                    April 22, 2019
Percy Sledge -                     May 11, 2007
Jo El Sonnier -                    October 9, 2009
Joe Stampley -                     October 9, 2010
Warren Storm -                     September 10, 2010
Irma Thomas -                      April 14, 2007
Luke Thompson - October 27, 2011
Wayne Toups -                      October 13, 2011
Allen Toussaint -                  August 2, 2009
Wilson "Willie Tee" Turbinton -    April 14, 2007
The Uniques - October 9, 2010
Vince Vance -                      November 28, 2010
Larry Williams -                   February 9, 2014
Lucinda Williams -                 September 16, 2013
Gregg Wright -                     2013
Zebra -      July 10, 2010

Songwriters Annex Members
Andrew Bernard
Tony Haselden
Casey Kelly
Huey P. Long & Castro Carazo
Leon Medica
Cyril Vetter

Performers Stage Members
Charles Connor
Paul Ferrara

Studio Room Members
Bill Johnston
Larry McKinley
Paul Marks
Eddie Shuler

Regional Hall of Fame Members
Baton Rouge
Clutch
C'Vello
The Dots
Henry Gray
The Inn Crowd
Shotgun LeBoa & the Livestock Show
Raful Neal
Rudi Richard
Lee Tillman
Debbie Traylor
Zaemon

New Orleans
Lenny Capello
Joe Clay
Benny Grunch
Little Freddie King
J J Muggler Band
Eddie Powers
Randy Jackson (Zebra)
Coco Robicheaux
Ernie Vincent
Walter "Wolfman" Washington

Acadiana
Bas Clas
Boogie Kings
Cookie and the Cupcakes
Sheryl Cormier
T K Hulin
Jivin' Gene Bourgeois
Iry LeJeune
Charles Mann
Belton Richard
G G Shinn
Lil Buck Senegal
Willie Tee Trahan

North Louisiana
Bill Brent
Al Ferrier

LMHOF Future Famers Members
Glen David Andrews
L'Angelus
Amanda Shaw
Chase Tyler

LMHOF Special Members
Steve Cropper
Jimmy Hall
Jimi Jamison
Mickey Montalbano
Jim Peterik

See also
 List of music museums

References

External links
Louisiana Music Hall of Fame

Country music awards
American folk music
Music halls of fame
Halls of fame in Louisiana
State halls of fame in the United States
Awards established in 2005
2005 establishments in Louisiana
Museums in Baton Rouge, Louisiana